The News of Texas was a statewide newscast in Texas. It was syndicated to 27 affiliate stations in the state by the San Antonio-based Texas Network (TXN) between 1999 and 2000.

History

In July 1998, TXN started up, just as Belo Corporation (owners of a chain of Texas television stations - KENS, WFAA, KHOU-TV, and later KVUE) founded Texas Cable News (TXCN). TXCN launched easily in early 1999, gaining carriage in San Antonio, Dallas, and Houston, but Time Warner Cable Austin refused to carry TXCN due to starting up News 8 Austin (now YNN Austin), one in a long list of Time Warner Cable 24-hour cable news television channels. (Belo did not own a station in Austin at the time.) TXCN was billed as a regional CNN, with news and weather for the entire state of Texas. In the summer of 1998, KVUE, the ABC affiliate in Austin, was acquired by Belo, adding a fourth Texas ABC station to the Belo mix as News 8 Austin started broadcasting.

Meanwhile, TXN was mainly signing up WB, UPN, and independent stations, which was a major concern. Fox affiliates were skeptical, and Big Three network affiliates were not considering the News of Texas at all. KNVA, one of the major hopes, pulled out of The News of Texas due to the startup of a KXAN-TV newscast. But KNVA would end up airing the News of Texas once the newscast was dropped. The News of Texas finally hit the air in January 1999.

The News of Texas was not a technical masterpiece, either. A "cannon-boom" music theme and amateurish graphics, along with internal splits over what was considered aggressive drug testing by executives were problematic for TXN's news department. In 2000, TXCN expanded its carriage immensely with a 10-year deal on most of Texas' Time Warner Cable systems. A 2000 refresh gave it a new news theme (its own Texas Highway by Stephen Arnold Music) - but affiliates were dropping the program quickly.

Meanwhile, TXN's news product eventually moved slowly to PBS stations such as Austin's KLRU, giving it reliable carriage but not advertising, along with the requirement to fill more time in place of those breaks. On 31 July 2000, after losing $45 million in news and even after an eleventh-hour restructuring which saw the layoffs of 40 of 120 staffers, The News of Texas signed off the air and TXN folded, leaving 13 affiliates to replace the programs it offered and 80 people out of work.

References

External links
 The News of Texas open, 1999 (with first theme and graphics)
 The News of Texas open, 2000 (with updated presentation)

1999 American television series debuts
2000 American television series endings
Mass media in San Antonio
Local news programming in the United States